The Golden Gate Park windmills are two historic windmills located at Golden Gate Park in San Francisco, California.

 Dutch Windmill (Golden Gate Park), the northern of two functioning windmills, completed in 1903
 Murphy Windmill, the southern of two functioning windmills, completed in 1908

Windmills in California
Lists of windmills in the United States
Lists of buildings and structures in California